Kuželjevec is a small settlement in the Municipality of Ivančna Gorica in central Slovenia. It lies in the hills between Ambrus and the right bank of the Krka River in the historical region of Lower Carniola. The municipality is now included in the Central Slovenia Statistical Region.

References

External links
Kuželjevec at Geopedia

Populated places in the Municipality of Ivančna Gorica